Secret People is a 1952 British drama film, directed by Thorold Dickinson and produced by Sidney Cole for Ealing Studios, with a screenplay from Thorold Dickinson, Wolfgang Wilhelm, Joyce Carey and Christianna Brand. Secret People stars Valentina Cortese, Serge Reggiani and Audrey Hepburn and premiered in the U.K. on 8 February 1952. The film provided Audrey Hepburn with her first significant film role, leading to her big breakthrough in Roman Holiday.

Plot
In 1930, Maria Brentano (Valentina Cortese) and her younger sister Nora (Audrey Hepburn) flee to London as their father is about to be executed by his country's dictator. Seven years later, Maria unexpectedly meets Louis (Serge Reggiani), her childhood sweetheart, who is engaged in a plot to assassinate the dictator. Maria is persuaded to play an active part in the plan, but it all goes horribly wrong when the bomb they plant kills an innocent waitress, causing Maria much distress.

Cast

Audrey Hepburn
After having appeared in a string of bit parts and small speaking roles, the film provided Audrey Hepburn with her first significant film role, leading to her big breakthrough in Roman Holiday: on 18 September 1951, shortly after Secret People was finished but before its premiere, Thorold Dickinson made a screen test with the young starlet and sent it to director William Wyler, who was in Rome preparing Roman Holiday. Wyler wrote a glowing note of thanks to Dickinson, saying that "as a result of the test, a number of the producers at Paramount have expressed interest in casting her."

Release
Although finished before August 1951 (the film was screened by the BBFC censors on 7 August 1951), it didn't premiere at Odeon Leicester Square in London until 8 February 1952.

Reception
The film reviewer for The Times found Secret People to be "a confused, inarticulate, disappointing film, neither as imaginative nor as intellectually exciting as it should be."

In contrast, George Perry wrote in Forever Ealing that "...there is much of interest in the Ealing film, such as the moral dilemma of those who have to resort to force to overcome force."
He also praised "a sensitive performance by Valentina Cortesa, ...a substantial role for Audrey Hepburn", and felt that the film had been misinterpreted and "was in some respects ahead of its time."

The film was a box office flop.

References

External links
 
 

 

1952 films
1950s spy drama films
British spy drama films
Films directed by Thorold Dickinson
Films about assassinations
Films set in London
Films set in Paris
Films set in Dublin (city)
Films set in the 1930s
Ealing Studios films
British black-and-white films
Compositions by Robert Gerhard
1950s English-language films
1950s British films